Round Harbor was a small settlement with only two families in 1864. It was located on Fogo Island, Newfoundland and Labrador.

Today there are 22 houses, with four families.  There are no schools, stores, medics, police, etc.  Residents dispose of their own garbage and have private water sources.  There was an Anglican church, with services once a month.

See also
List of communities in Newfoundland and Labrador

Populated coastal places in Canada
Populated places in Newfoundland and Labrador